The Lithuanian Union of Political Prisoners and Deportees was a political party in Lithuania between 1990 and 2004. It represented interest of those repressed by the Soviet regime, particularly political prisoners and deportees to Siberia, as well as of the activist struggling for Lithuanian independence.

History
The organization was established on 30 July 1988 as the Club of the Exiled (Tremtinio klubas) of Sąjūdis in Kaunas, later becoming a political party. Audrius Butkevičius was an establisher and chairman of the "Tremtinio klubas".

In the 1992 elections the ran on a joint list with the Lithuanian Christian Democratic Party and the Lithuanian Democratic Party. The joint list won 18 seats, with the LPKTS taking 2. It ran alone in the 1996 elections, winning a single seat.

Audrius Butkevičius was an establisher and chairman of the "Tremtinio klubas" ("Club of Deportees") of Sąjūdis in Kaunas, the precursor of the Lithuanian Union of Political Prisoners and Deportees.

The party ran in alliance with the Homeland Union in the 2000 elections, with 19 of its candidates on the Homeland list. In 2004 it merged into the Homeland Union. However it was not dissolved into the Homeland Union and remains its structural unit (the Political Prisoners and Deportees faction).

Leaders
 Balys Gajauskas, the first chairman
 , 1997–1999; moved to the Homeland Union in 1999
 Antanas Lukša
 , 2014-2019
 Arvydas Anušauskas, since 2019

References

External links 
 Official website

Defunct political parties in Lithuania
Political parties established in 1988
Political parties disestablished in 2004
Political imprisonment in the Soviet Union